Carolyn Hanley Hax is an American writer and columnist for The Washington Post and author of the daily syndicated advice column, Carolyn Hax (formerly titled Tell Me About It), which features broad relational advice. Originally targeting readers under 30, the column evolved to became more encompassing. Each column features a cartoon by her now ex-husband, Nick Galifianakis.

Early life and education
Carolyn Hanley Hax was born December 5, 1966, in Bridgeport, Connecticut. She grew up in Trumbull, the youngest of four daughters. Her father, John H. Hax, now retired, was director of research planning at Sikorsky Aircraft in Stratford. Her mother was Elizabeth O'Connell Hax (1940-2002). Carolyn Hax graduated from Hopkins School in 1984 and earned a Bachelor of Arts degree from Harvard University (1988).

Career
 
Hax was associate editor and news editor at the Army Times, and copy editor and news editor at The Washington Post.

Since 1997, she has written an advice column for The Washington Post entitled Carolyn Hax, which was earlier titled Tell Me About It. The column is published daily and syndicated by The Washington Post Syndicate to more than 200 newspapers. It features single-panel cartoons by Hax's ex-husband, Nick Galifianakis, and has since their inception. Tell Me About It originally provided advice targeted at readers under 30, but has since evolved to have a broadened message and audience.

In 2001, Hax published her first book, Tell Me About It: Lying, Sulking, and Getting Fat and 56 Other Things Not to Do While Looking for Love.

Her essay "Peace and Carrots" was included in the 2006 anthology Mommy Wars: Stay-at-Home and Career Moms Face Off on Their Choices, Their Lives, Their Families.

Hax also hosts a weekly Friday web chat, Carolyn Hax Live, at  the paper's website, with selected transcripts published subsequently.

Personal life
Hax married her first husband, cartoonist Nick Galifianakis, in 1994. Hax divorced Galifianakis in June 2002. She was pregnant with twins by the man who would become her second husband at the time of her divorce, and had been separated from Galifianakis for 10 months at the time she got pregnant. Despite this, some of her readers were critical.  Hax discussed her situation in her weekly online chat, Carolyn Hax Live. Hax and Galifianakis continue to collaborate on the advice column (he continuing to providing the cartoon), despite the divorce. Galifianakis has publicly commented on their eight-year relationship as well, saying, "We were a great couple that could maybe be greater apart. The point of the column is not to keep people together; it's for people to be happy. And sometimes being happy means making that kind of adjustment, where maybe you're not together."

Hax married her second husband, a childhood friend, Ken Ackerman, in November 2002, and they are parents of twin boys and another son. Hax and Ackerman reside in Massachusetts.

References

External links

 Hax's section at Washingtonpost.com
 Hax's page on the Washington Post Writers Group web site.
 Carolyn Hax And Nick Galifianakis: Tell Me About It
 Carolyn Hax reflects on giving advice

1966 births
Living people
Harvard University alumni
American advice columnists
American women columnists
American women journalists
Writers from Bridgeport, Connecticut
The Washington Post journalists
Hopkins School alumni
People from Trumbull, Connecticut
20th-century American journalists
21st-century American journalists
Journalists from Connecticut
20th-century American women
21st-century American women